Marguerite Beverley Stone (1916–2003) became Purdue University's first Dean of Students in 1974, and the first woman to hold a position of this kind at a Big Ten university. Stone began her twenty-four-year career at Purdue in 1956 as an Assistant Dean of Women. In 1968 she succeeded Helen B. Schleman as Purdue's Dean of Women. During the 1960s Stone supported a new requirement appointed students to Purdue's faculty committees. When the Dean of Women and Dean of Men offices were combined in 1974, Stone succeeded Acting Dean Bryan Clemins to become Dean of Students.  In addition to her administrative role at Purdue, Stone co-authored Counseling Women with her colleague, Barbara I. Cook. Stone was active in numerous professional and community organizations and a recipient of many honors and awards. She retired from Purdue in 1980; her successor as Dean of Students was Barbara I. Cook, one of her assistants. A sculpture honoring Stone and Cook was erected on Purdue's West Lafayette, Indiana, campus.

Early life and education 
Marguerite Beverley Stone was born on June 10, 1916, in Norfolk, Virginia.

In 1932, she began classes at Randolph-Macon Woman's College in Lynchburg, Virginia. She graduated in 1936. After starting a teaching position at a Norfolk high school, she took summer classes at Teachers College of Columbia University to earn a master's degree in student personnel administration, graduating in 1940. She then took a position at Tusculum College in Greeneville, Tennessee, where she served as an assistant professor of history.

During World War II, Beverley applied and was accepted into the United States Naval Women's Reserve, known as WAVES or Women Accepted for Volunteer Emergency Service. In September 1943, she began training at Midshipman Training School at Smith College. She was commissioned in November, 1943.

Beverley earned a student dean professional diploma from Teachers College of Columbia University in 1956.

Career 
Beverley accepted a position at Purdue University in 1956, as Assistant Dean of Women. Purdue University's Dean of Women at the time was Helen Schleman.

Beverley retired as Dean of Students from Purdue University in 1980.

Death 
Beverley died on April 16, 2003. She was eighty-six years old. She was buried with her family in her birthplace of Norfolk, Virginia.

Honors and tributes 
In 1980, Beverley received the first Distinguished Purdue Woman Award, a Distinguished Old Master citation, and the M. Beverley Stone Award was established in her honor.

In 1984, the Purdue Panhellenic Association officially unveiled a memorial to Beverley. The association spent the previous five years raising money through plant sales. A plaque on the memorial marker reads, "In honor of M. Beverley Stone, Dean of Student Emerita, for her 24 years of loving concern for students and for her exemplary leadership to Panhellenic, the sororities, and the University--Donated by the Purdue Panhellenic Association, October 1984." The memorial marker is located in Purdue University's Purdue Memorial Union on the intersection of Grant and State Streets. Her memorial marker is one of three markers honoring past Purdue University Dean of Students; the other two women honored are Barbara Ivy Wood Cook and Betty M. Nelson, and their markers were installed years later.

Selected published works 
 Counseling Women (Guidance Monograph Series. No. 7: Special topics in Counseling) (1973), co-authored with Barbara I. Cook
 "Retirement Adjustments"

Notes

1916 births
2003 deaths
Female United States Navy officers
Purdue University people
Randolph College alumni
Teachers College, Columbia University alumni
WAVES personnel
21st-century American women